Carlo Benetti (1885–1949) was an Italian film actor of the silent era. During the sound era he worked as production manager on a number of films.

Selected filmography
 Assunta Spina (1915)
 The Lady of the Camellias (1915)
 The Blind Woman of Sorrento (1916)
 Odette (1916)
 The Voyage (1921)
 The Closed Mouth (1925)
 The Golden Vein (1928)
 Kif Tebbi (1928)

References

Bibliography
 Goble, Alan. The Complete Index to Literary Sources in Film. Walter de Gruyter, 1999.

External links

1885 births
1949 deaths
Italian male film actors
Italian male silent film actors
Actors from Florence
20th-century Italian male actors
Film people from Florence